Pancalia sichotella is a moth in the family Cosmopterigidae. It was described by Hugo Theodor Christoph in 1882. It is found in the Russian Far East.

References

Arctiidae genus list. Butterflies and Moths of the World. Natural History Museum, London.

Moths described in 1882
Antequerinae